Fusitriton magellanicus is a species of predatory sea snail, a marine gastropod mollusk in the family Cymatiidae.

Description

Distribution

References

 Lamarck J.B. (1816). Liste des objets représentés dans les planches de cette livraison. In: Tableau encyclopédique et méthodique des trois règnes de la Nature. Mollusques et Polypes divers. Agasse, Paris. 16 pp.
 Tomlin, J.R. le B. (1947). A new South African cymatiid. Journal of Conchology 22: 245–246
 Smith E.A. (1891). Descriptions of new species of shells from the "Challenger" expedition. Proceedings of the Zoological Society of London. (1891): 436-445, pls 34-35
 Maxwell, P.A. (2009). Cenozoic Mollusca. Pp 232-254 in Gordon, D.P. (ed.) New Zealand inventory of biodiversity. Volume one. Kingdom Animalia: Radiata, Lophotrochozoa, Deuterostomia. Canterbury University Press, Christchurch.

External links
 Herbert, D.G., Jones, G.J. & Atkinson, L.J. (2018). Phylum Mollusca. In: Atkinson, L.J. and Sink, K.J. (eds) Field Guide to the Offshore Marine Invertebrates of South Africa. Malachite Marketing and Media: Pretoria. Pp. 249–320.

Cymatiidae